Dan Moses Schreier is an American composer and sound designer.  He is best known for his theatrical music work, on Broadway and elsewhere.

Schreier is from Detroit, and lives in New York City.  He studied music at the University of Michigan and at Columbia University.

Awards
Dan Moses Schreier won Drama Desk Awards for Outstanding Sound Design for Floyd Collins (1996), Into the Woods (2002), Assassins (2004), and American Psycho (2016). He received Drama Desk Award nominations for Outstanding Sound Design for Spic-O-Rama (1993),  God's Heart (1997), Sweeney Todd (2006), Passion (2013), A Gentleman's Guide to Love and Murder (2014), Act One (also 2014), and Pacific Overtures (2018), and a nomination for Outstanding Music in a Play for The Merchant of Venice (2011).

Schreier was nominated for Tony Awards for Best Sound Design of a Musical for Gypsy (2008), A Little Night Music (2010), and Sondheim on Sondheim (also 2010), and for Best Sound Design of a Play for Act One (2014) and The Iceman Cometh (2018).

In 1990 Schreier won an Obie Award for Sustained Excellence of Sound Design.  In 2003 he won an L.A. Ovation Award for Sound Design in a Larger Theater for Gem of the Ocean.

References

External links
 Dan Moses Schreier's official website
 
 Dan Moses Schreier at Internet Off-Broadway Database
 
 

American audio engineers
American male composers
21st-century American composers
Broadway sound designers
Columbia University alumni
Drama Desk Award winners
Living people
Obie Award recipients
Musicians from Detroit
University of Michigan School of Music, Theatre & Dance alumni

Place of birth missing (living people)
Year of birth missing (living people)
Engineers from New York (state)
21st-century American male musicians
Columbia University School of the Arts alumni
New York University alumni
Juilliard School alumni